The following list includes notable people who were born or have lived in Concord, Massachusetts.

Writers

 Seth Abramson, poet
 Amos Bronson Alcott, teacher and writer
 Louisa May Alcott, novelist
 Amelia Atwater-Rhodes, novelist
 Jane G. Austin, writer of historical fiction
 William Ellery Channing, poet
 Patricia Cornwell, contemporary American crime writer and author
 George William Curtis, writer and speaker
 Ralph Waldo Emerson, essayist, poet and philosopher
 Edward Waldo Emerson, physician, writer and lecturer
 Will Eno, author and playwright
 Allen French, author and historian (including of the history of the town)
 Doris Kearns Goodwin, historian and writer
 Nathaniel Hawthorne, novelist and short story writer
 George Parsons Lathrop, poet and novelist
 Alan Lightman, physicist, novelist and essayist
 Gregory Maguire, author
 Russell Miller, author and historian
 Robert B. Parker, author
 David Allen Sibley, ornithologist and author
 Margaret Sidney (pseudonym of Harriett Mulford Stone Lothrop), author
 Henry David Thoreau, author, naturalist and philosopher
 Gordon S. Wood, historian and author

Journalists
 Frederic Hudson, journalist
 Joel Kurtzman, economist and journalist
 William Stevens Robinson, journalist
 Franklin Benjamin Sanborn, journalist, author and reformer

Musicians

 Andrew McMahon, musician and lead singer of Something Corporate and Jack's Mannequin
 Dean Rosenthal, composer and musician

Actors

 Paget Brewster, actress
 Chris Evans, actor
 Scott Evans, actor
 Steve Carell, actor, producer, and director
 John Augustus Stone, actor, dramatist and playwright

Athletes

 Casper Asbjornson, Major League Baseball player
 Laurie Baker, USA ice hockey gold medalist
 Michael Fucito, Major League Soccer player
 Hal Gill, National Hockey League player
 Tom Glavine, Major League Baseball player
 Dick Kazmaier, Princeton college football player who was the last Ivy League Heisman Trophy winner
 Kara Mann, strongwoman and chemical engineer
 Uta Pippig, marathon runner
 Sam Presti, NBA executive
 John Tortorella, Philadelphia Flyers head coach

Politicians

 Chris Abele, county executive of Milwaukee County, Wisconsin
 William Emerson, minister, father of Ralph Waldo Emerson
 Richard Fadden, CSIS Director
 Richard N. Goodwin, advisor and speechwriter to Presidents Kennedy and Johnson
 Ebenezer R. Hoar, U.S. Attorney General
 George Frisbie Hoar, U.S. Congressman and Senator
 Samuel Hoar, U.S. Congressman
 Jonas Wheeler, Maine Senate President
 William Whiting, lawyer, writer and politician
 Samuel Willard, 17th century colonial minister
 Simon Willard, 17th century intellectual and former British major who co-founded Concord

Military
 Charles Francis Adams Jr., Civil War Colonel, Union Army, Great-Grandson of President John Quincy Adams
 Charles Francis Adams III, 44th Secretary of the Navy
 Oscar C. Badger, U.S. Navy officer
 John Buttrick, Concord militia leader
 Jonathan Hoar, colonial soldier
 Samuel Prescott, American Revolutionary War "The Ride" with Paul Revere and William Dawes
 Thomas Wheeler, soldier in King Philip's War

Others

 Samuel Bartlett, silversmith
 Tim Berners-Lee, British computer scientist, best known as the inventor of the World Wide Web
 Frank Hagar Bigelow, U.S. astronomer and meteorologist
 Daniel Bliss, jurist, proscribed by the Massachusetts Banishment Act
 Peter Bulkley, Puritan preacher and a co-founder of Concord
 Ephraim Bull, inventor of the Concord grape
 Steve Carell, comedian (lived in Acton but attended The Fenn School and also attended The Middlesex School)
 Darby Conley, cartoonist
 Bob Diamond, former chief executive of Barclays
 Harrison Gray Dyar, chemist and inventor
 Daniel Chester French, sculptor
 William Watson Goodwin, classical scholar
 John Hoar, redeemer of famed captive Mary Rowlandson during King Philip's War
 Dick Hustvedt, software engineer
 Edward Holton James, socialist
 Edward Jarvis, physician and statistician
 Har Gobind Khorana, notable Indian American biochemist who shared the 1968 Nobel Prize for Physiology or Medicine
 Lynn Harold Loomis, mathematician and co-discoverer of the Loomis–Whitney inequality
 Alfred W. McCoy, historian and educator
 Jane Mendillo, CEO of Harvard Management Company
 William Munroe, first manufacturer of lead pencils in America
 Abigail May Alcott Nieriker, artist
 Betty (Parris) Barron, Slaveowner and Salem Witch Trials Accuser
 Ezra Ripley, clergyman
Alice Ruggles Sohier, painter
 Robert Solow, Nobel laureate in economics
 Stephen Wolfram, British-born scientist and developer of Mathematica software
 Chris Wysopal, entrepreneur and cybersecurity pioneer

See also
 List of people from Massachusetts

References

 
Concord, New Hampshire
Concord